VictoriArena is a football stadium in Rosport, in eastern Luxembourg and is currently the home stadium of FC Victoria Rosport.  The stadium has a capacity of 2,500.

References
World Stadiums - Luxembourg

Football venues in Luxembourg
Rosport